The 2009 Women's Cricket World Cup was the ninth edition of the Women's Cricket World Cup, held in Australia from 7 to 22 March 2009.

England won the tournament, beating New Zealand in the final to claim their third World Cup title. England batter Claire Taylor was the leading run-scorer and Player of the Tournament, whilst teammate Laura Marsh was the leading wicket-taker. Australia, West Indies, India and Pakistan were eliminated at the Super Six stage, whilst South Africa and Sri Lanka were eliminated in the first round.

Teams

Host selection and venues
The ICC, along with Cricket Australia, announced in July 2008 that six venues in New South Wales would host the tournament. The venues chosen were North Sydney Oval, Bankstown Oval and Drummoyne Oval (all in Sydney), Manuka Oval in Canberra, No. 1 Sports Ground in Newcastle and Bradman Oval in Bowral. In addition, four grounds in Sydney (Manly Oval, Old King's Oval, Raby Oval No. 1 and Village Green) hosted the nine warm-up matches for the tournament.

Qualification
Six of the eight teams involved in the tournament qualified through finishing in the top six in the previous tournament; Australia, India, England, New Zealand, Sri Lanka and West Indies therefore qualified automatically for the tournament. The final two places were awarded to Pakistan and South Africa; the two finalists of the 2008 Women's Cricket World Cup Qualifier.

Rules and regulations

Matches

All matches started at 10am local time (UTC+11) and were played to standard One Day International playing conditions. All matches were to be 50 overs a side unless stated otherwise by the umpires or match referee, with each bowler entitled to bowl a maximum of 10 overs per match.

In the event of bad weather, the side batting second must have batted a minimum of 20 overs for a result to be declared (if the match was not otherwise won, for example if the team batting second was dismissed before the completion of 20 overs). In the event of interrupted matches (due to rain or some other factor), the Duckworth–Lewis method was applied to determine the result or revised target.

Tournament points and format
Throughout the group and Super Six stages, two points were awarded to teams for a win, one point for a tie or matches that ended with no result, and no points were awarded for a defeat.

At the conclusion of the group stage, the three teams in each group with the most points advanced to the Super Six stage of the tournament (the first time such a stage had been held), while the two teams eliminated played in a 7th/8th place playoff. Points from matches between teams both qualifying for the Super Six stage were carried forward, therefore all six teams to advance began the Super Sixes with two games played. Following the conclusion of the Super Sixes, the top two teams contested the final, third and fourth contested a third-place play-off, while fifth and sixth played each other for fifth place.

Results

Group stage
The eight qualifying teams were split into two groups for the group stage, with traditional rivals Australia and New Zealand drawn together in Group A alongside South Africa and the West Indies, while India and Pakistan were drawn together in Group B along with England and Sri Lanka. The group stage took place between 7 and 12 March 2009.

Group A

Group B

Super Sixes
The top three teams in each group moved on to the Super Six stage which is scored as a complete round-robin. But each of the six teams played only three new matches, rather than five—each group's three representatives carried forward their result against each other rather than play again. Thus the table, showing five matches for each team, covers all matches between the Super Six qualifiers, including those from the group stage.

The top two teams in the final table qualified for the final.

The Super Six stage of the tournament took place between 14 and 19 March 2009.

Play-Offs

3rd place playoff

5th place playoff

7th place playoff

Final

Awards

Team of the tournament

The day after the final, the ICC announced its World Cup XI, as selected by a panel led by Belinda Clark. The eleven included five members of England's tournament-winning squad, with three coming from India, two coming from runners-up New Zealand and one from Australia.

  Suzie Bates
  Shelley Nitschke
  Claire Taylor
  Mithali Raj
  Charlotte Edwards (captain)
  Kate Pulford
  Sarah Taylor (wicket-keeper)
  Amita Sharma
  Katherine Brunt
  Priyanka Roy
  Laura Marsh

New Zealand's Sophie Devine was named as the side's twelfth man.

Player of the tournament
The award for player of the tournament was selected by the same panel that chose the team of the tournament, and was awarded to the leading run-scorer Claire Taylor.

References

External links

Official Website
World Cup at Cricinfo.com
ICC Women's Cricket World Cup 2008-09 Schedule & Results

 
2009
International cricket competitions in 2009
2008–09 Australian women's cricket season
March 2009 sports events in Australia
2009 in women's cricket
International women's cricket competitions in Australia